Ousmane Sy (born 18 February 1988, in Montbéliard) is a French former professional footballer who played as a forward and made 12 appearances for Seria B club Reggina Calcio in the 2010–11 season.

References

Living people
1988 births
Sportspeople from Montbéliard
French sportspeople of Guinean descent
French footballers
Association football forwards
Black French sportspeople
Footballers from Bourgogne-Franche-Comté
Expatriate footballers in Italy
French expatriate sportspeople in Italy
French expatriate footballers
Reggina 1914 players
Benevento Calcio players
Taranto F.C. 1927 players
A.C. Perugia Calcio players
S.S. Fidelis Andria 1928 players
Treviso F.B.C. 1993 players
Matera Calcio players
F.C. Real Città di Vico Equense players